Slyne Head Lighthouse (Irish: Ceann Léime) is located at the  westernmost point of County Galway, about  southwest of Doonlaughan, Ireland on the island of Illaunamid. It is maintained by Commissioners of Irish Lights (CIL). There were two lighthouses on this point built in 1836, but only the western one remains active.

See also 

 List of lighthouses in Ireland

References

External links 
 
 photo by Jean Guichard
 Commissioners of Irish Lights

Lighthouses completed in 1836
Galway
Lighthouses in the Republic of Ireland
Lighthouses on the National Inventory of Architectural Heritage